"Hell of a View" is a song by American country artist Eric Church. He co-wrote the track with Casey Beathard and Monty Criswell. It is the lead single from Church's album Soul, part of a triple album set. The track features backing vocals from Church's longtime collaborator Joanna Cotten.

Background
Church was in the mountains of North Carolina when he returned from a jog to hear co-writer Casey Beathard play the song which he had been working on with Monty Criswell. Church said it felt like a "big hit but at the same time it has that timeless quality to it". The men finished writing the song and recorded it that same night.

Critical reception
"Hell of a View" received generally positive reviews, with many positively noting the presence of Joanna Cotten's vocals. Craig Shelburne of CMT called the song a "romantic new single", noting Cotten's "powerful harmony" as a backing vocalist. Jon Freeman of Rolling Stone referred to the track as a "tender mid-tempo ballad", saying it "depicts the thrill of a life on the move with the one you love". Freeman also noted Cotten's "soulful voice" as a "big presence". Angela Stefano of Taste of Country called the song a "a love song for rebels".

Commercial performance
"Hell of a View" is Church's highest charting single since 2012's "Springsteen", as well as the second highest of his career, peaking at number 28 on the Billboard Hot 100.

Live performance
Church performed "Hell of a View" at the 54th Annual Country Music Association Awards in November 2020.

Charts

Weekly charts

Year-end charts

Certifications

Release history

References

2020 singles
2020 songs
Eric Church songs
Songs written by Casey Beathard
Songs written by Eric Church
Songs written by Monty Criswell
Song recordings produced by Jay Joyce
EMI Records singles